This is a list of defunct professional rugby league clubs.

Australia

New South Wales Rugby League (1908-1994)

ARL (1995-1997), SL (1997) and NRL (1998-)

The teams listed above, with the exception of Adelaide, Hunter, Gold Coast, Northern Eagles and South Queensland still participate in lower level competitions, including the NSW Cup, S.G. Ball and Harold Matthews competitions.

Queensland Cup (1996-)

This section particularly includes the Queensland Rugby League sides which no longer compete in the top level of that league.

Brisbane Rugby League (1909-1997)

United Kingdom
These clubs competed in the Rugby Football League from 1895.

France

 AS Saint Estève (1965-2000)
Merged with XIII Catalan to form Union Treiziste Catalane.
 Celtic de Paris (1950-197?)
 Marseille XIII (1946-2006)
 Paris Saint-Germain (1996-1997)
 XIII Catalan (1935-2000)
Merged with AS Saint Estève to form Union Treiziste Catalane.

New Zealand

Bartercard Cup (2000-)

 Eastern Tornadoes (2000 - 2005)
 Marist Richmond Brothers (2000 - 2005)
 North Harbour Tigers (2003 - 2005)
 Otahuhu Ellerslie Leopards (2004 - 2005)
 Porirua Pumas (2000 - 2001)
 Taranaki Wildcats (2002 - 2003)

Lion Red Cup (1994-1996)

Auckland City Vulcans (1994)
Canterbury Country Cardinals (1994-6)
Christchurch City Shiners (1994-6)
Counties Manukau Heroes (1994-6)
Hutt Valley Firehawks (1994-6)
North Harbour Sea Eagles (1994-6)
Waitakere City Raiders (1994-6)
Wellington City Dukes (1994-6)

Wales

Welsh League (1908-1909)

(these teams also competed in the Northern Rugby Football Union)

Welsh League (1949-55)

Northern Rugby Football Union (1895- )

See also
List of defunct rugby league clubs in the United States

References

External links
All league tables for the UK pro game since 1895

Defunct

Rugby league clubs
Defunct